Henry Richardson (4 October 1857 – 20 March 1940) was an English cricketer who played in first-class cricket matches for Nottinghamshire, the Players, the Marylebone Cricket Club (MCC) and several other teams between 1887 and 1894. He was born and died at Bulwell, Nottinghamshire.

References

1857 births
1940 deaths
English cricketers
Nottinghamshire cricketers
Players cricketers
Marylebone Cricket Club cricketers
North v South cricketers
Liverpool and District cricketers
H. Philipson's XI cricketers